Patrick J. Gillis is a Republican politician in the U.S. state of Oregon. He was a member of the Oregon House of Representatives until he was recalled by voters on March 26, 1985, after he admitted to falsifying letters of support he had cited in the Oregon Voter's Pamphlet, and was accused of falsely claiming to have earned a master's degree. He was acquitted of the latter charge, but by then had been recalled by voters, after serving only 67 days in the Legislature. John Minnis was appointed to fill the seat in the House.

References 

Living people
Republican Party members of the Oregon House of Representatives
Year of birth missing (living people)